Northern Ireland competed at the 1934 British Empire Games in London, from 4 to 11 August 1934.

Medalists

Athletics 

Track and road events

Field Events

Boxing

Cycling 

Track

Lawn Bowls

References

1934 in Northern Ireland sport
Northern Ireland at the Commonwealth Games
Nations at the 1934 British Empire Games